Beatrice Erskine Lane Suzuki ( 1878–1939) was an American Theosophist, who was instrumental in promoting Theosophy in Japan. Lane Suzuki is often eclipsed by her famous husband, Japanese writer and scholar D. T. Suzuki.
Born in Newark, New Jersey, Lane was educated at Radcliffe College, where one of her tutors was William James, graduating in 1898. She also completed a Master of Arts degree in social work at Columbia University in 1908.

Lane married Suzuki in 1911.

The Suzukis, along with her mother, joined the Tokyo International Lodge of the Theosophical Society in 1920. Lane Suzuki fulfilled various official roles in the Lodge. Lane Suzuki and her husband later founded the Mahayana Lodge with a more explicitly Buddhist focus. Letters from the time speak of the difficulty of spreading Theosophy in Buddhist Japan, since Theosophy draws heavily on Buddhism.

Lane Suzuki published numerous books on Buddhism and Japanese culture. These have seen many reprints and editions as well as being translated into many languages.

Publications
 1931: Kōya San: the home of Kobō Daishi and his Shingon doctrine.
 1932: Noḡaku: Japanese nō plays.
 1933: Buddhism and practical life.
 1934: Buddhist readings.
 1938: Mahayana Buddhism. London: The Buddhist Lodge.
 1940: Impressions of Mahayana Buddhism. The Eastern Buddhist Society, Otani Buddhist College; London: Luzac and Company, London.
 1959: Mahayana Buddhism: a brief outline.

See also

 Buddhism and Theosophy
 Japanese Zen
 Timeline of Zen Buddhism in the United States
 Theosophy
 Zen Narratives

References

Sources
 Algeo, Adele S. 2007 "Beatrice Lane Suzuki: An American Theosophist in Japan." Quest  95.1 (January–February 2007): 13–17.
 Barrett, Warrick L. 2006. "Beatrice Erskine Lane Suzuki." Find a Grave.

1870s births
1939 deaths
American Zen Buddhists
Zen Buddhism writers
Theosophists
Writers from Newark, New Jersey
Radcliffe College alumni
Columbia University alumni